Rudigullithi da Silva Henrique (born 8 October 1993), commonly known as Gullithi, is a Brazilian footballer who currently plays as a defender for Esportivo.

Career statistics

Club

Notes

References

External links
Gullithi at ZeroZero

1993 births
Living people
Brazilian footballers
Brazilian expatriate footballers
Association football defenders
Fluminense FC players
Clube Esportivo Aimoré players
Sport Club São Paulo players
América Futebol Clube (RN) players
F.C. Arouca players
Clube Esportivo Bento Gonçalves players
Brazilian expatriate sportspeople in Portugal
Expatriate footballers in Portugal
Footballers from Rio de Janeiro (city)